The Secunderabad–Porbandar Weekly Express is an Express train belonging to Western Railway zone that runs between  and  in India. It is currently being operated with 19201/19202 train numbers on a weekly basis.

Coach composition

The train has standard ICF rakes with max speed of 110 kmph. The train consists of 23 coaches:

 1 AC II Tier
 5 AC III Tier
 10 Sleeper coaches
 1 Pantry car
 4 General Unreserved
 2 Seating cum Luggage Rake

Service

The 19201/Secunderabad–Porbandar Weekly Express has an average speed of 54 km/hr and covers 1682 km in 31 hrs 05 mins. 
The 19202/Porbandar–Secunderabad Weekly Express has an average speed of 54 km/hr and covers 1682 km in 31 hrs 30 mins.

Route and halts 

The important halts of the train are:

Schedule

Traction

Both trains are hauled by a Vatva Loco Shed-based WDM-3A diesel locomotive from Secunderabad to Porbandar and vice versa.

Rake sharing 

The train shares its rake with 12905/12906 Shalimar–Porbandar Superfast Express, 20937/20938 Porbandar–Delhi Sarai Rohilla Superfast Express and 19269/19270 Porbandar–Muzaffarpur Express.

See also 

 Howrah–Porbandar Express
 Porbandar railway station
 Porbandar–Delhi Sarai Rohilla Superfast Express
 Porbandar–Muzaffarpur Express

Notes

References

External links 

 19201/Secunderabad–Porbandar Weekly Express India Rail Info
 19202/Porbandar–Secunderabad Weekly Express India Rail Info

Transport in Secunderabad
Transport in Porbandar
Express trains in India
Rail transport in Telangana
Rail transport in Karnataka
Rail transport in Maharashtra
Rail transport in Gujarat
Railway services introduced in 2012